Hanza (also Romanized as Hanzā) is a village in Miankuh Rural District, in the Central District of Mehriz County, Yazd Province, Iran. At the 2006 census, its population was 134, in 48 families.

References 

Populated places in Mehriz County